The Middle Santiam Wilderness is a wilderness area located near Mount Washington in the central Cascade Range of Oregon, U.S., within the Willamette National Forest.

Topography
The Middle Santiam Wilderness ranges from steep slopes, high peaks, and ridges at the higher elevations to gently sloping and bench-like terrain in the lower elevations.  The most prominent features include Donaca Lake, the Middle Santiam River, and the 4,965-foot Chimney Peak, a lava plug in the northwestern portion of the Wilderness.  Not far to the south of the Middle Santiam Wilderness lies Menagerie Wilderness.

Flora and fauna
Douglas-fir, western redcedar and western hemlock grow at lower elevations and true firs near the ridgelines. Native fish populations, including Chinook salmon during spawning season, thrive in both the Santiam River and Donaca Lake.

See also 
 List of Oregon Wildernesses
 List of U.S. Wilderness Areas
 Wilderness Act
 List of old growth forests

References

External links
 Willamette National Forest - Middle Santiam Wilderness
 Willamette National Forest - Middle Santiam Trail Area
 Forests and Global Warming - Oregon Wild

Cascade Range
IUCN Category Ib
Old-growth forests
Wilderness areas of Oregon
Protected areas of Linn County, Oregon
Willamette National Forest
1984 establishments in Oregon
Protected areas established in 1984